A thunderbolt is a symbolic representation of lightning when accompanied by a loud thunderclap.

Thunderbolt or Thunderbolts may also refer to:

Entertainment

Cartoons and comics
 Thunderbolt (DC Comics), a comics character related to the character Johnny Thunder
 Thunderbolts (comics), a Marvel comic book title
 Peter Cannon, Thunderbolt, a Charlton Comics character
 Thunderbolt (Marvel Comics), either of two comics characters
 Thunderbolt Ross, a comics character
 Thunderbolt Jaxon, a comics character

Films
 Thunderbolt (1995 film), starring Jackie Chan
 Thunderbolt (1910 film), an Australian "outlaw" film
 The Thunderbolt, a 1912 American short drama film 

 Thunderbolt (1929 film), an American noir film directed by Josef von Sternberg
 Thunderbolt (1947 film), an American World War II documentary
 Thunderbolts (film), a Marvel Studios film planned for release in 2024
 Operation Thunderbolt (film), a 1977 Israeli film based on Operation Entebbe
 Quentin Tarantino's Thunderbolt, the fictitious "original title" of the film Death Proof

Games
 Colonel Volgin, also known as "Thunderbolt", a character in Metal Gear Solid 3: Snake Eater

Music
 Thunderbolt (band), a Norwegian heavy metal band
 Thunderbolt (album), by Saxon
 "Thunderbolt", a song by Björk from Biophilia
 "Thunderbolt", a song by Dozer from Madre de Dios
 "Thunderbolt", a song by BWO from Big Science
 "Thunderbolt", a song by Valesnia from Kosmos
 Thunderbolt - A Tribute To AC/DC, see list of AC/DC tribute albums

Military

Aircraft
Fairchild Republic A-10 Thunderbolt II, an American ground support aircraft
HESA Saeqeh ("Thunderbolt"), an Iranian fighter aircraft based on the American Northrop F-5
Mitsubishi J2M Raiden ("Thunderbolt"), a Japanese land-based fighter
Macchi C.202 Folgore (Italian "thunderbolt"), was an WWII Italian fighter aircraft developed and manufactured by Macchi Aeronautica
Republic P-47 Thunderbolt, a United States Army Air Force fighter aircraft
Saab 37 Viggen, also known as Thunderbolt, a Swedish fighter and attack aircraft
SC-76 Thunderbolt, a British bolt-action rifle

Operations
 Operation Thunderbolt (disambiguation)
 Operation Entebbe or Thunderbolt, the Israeli Defense Force rescue of civilian hostages held at Entebbe, Uganda
 Operation Thunderbolt (1951), a United Nations offensive during the Korean War
 Operation Thunderbolt, a Singapore Armed Forces hostage rescue operation

Organizations
 Legio XII Fulminata, a Roman legion named for the Latin word for Thunderbolt
 11th Armored Division (United States), nicknamed "Thunderbolt"
 Sa'ka Forces (thunderbolt), an Egyptian military commando force
 As-Sa'iqa (thunderbolt), a Palestinian Ba'athist political and military faction
 Al-Saiqa (Libya) (thunderbolt), a special forces unit
 The Thunderbolts, the former aerobatic demonstration team of the Indian Air Force

Vehicles and vessels
 HMS Thunderbolt, any of several Royal Navy vessels
 USS Thunderbolt, a U.S. Navy patrol ship
 Thunderbolt-2000, a Republic of China (Taiwan) Army rocket launcher system
 Thunderbolt, a test bed variant of the M8 Armored Gun System

People
 Bayezid I (fl. 1389-1402), nicknamed Yıldırım ("Thunderbolt"), Ottoman sultan
 Captain Thunderbolt (1833–1870), Australian bushranger
 Georgios Kondylis (1878–1936), nicknamed Keravnos ("Thunderbolt"), Greek general and prime minister
 Krzysztof Mikołaj "the Thunderbolt" Radziwiłł (1547–1603), prince of the Holy Roman Empire and nobleman of the Polish-Lithuanian Commonwealth
 Ptolemy Keraunos (fl. 281-279 BC), King of Macedonia
 Thunderbolt Gibbons (fl. 1820), Irish leader of the secret Whiteboys agrarian organization
 Thunderbolt Patterson (born 1941), American professional wrestler
 Thunderbolt, female professional wrestler from the Gorgeous Ladies of Wrestling

Roller coasters
 Thunderbolt (Celebration City), in Branson, Missouri
 Thunderbolt (1925 roller coaster), defunct, at Coney Island, New York
 Thunderbolt (2014 roller coaster), at Coney Island, New York
 Thunderbolt (Dreamworld), defunct, in Queensland, Australia
 Thunderbolt (Kennywood), in West Mifflin, Pennsylvania
 Thunderbolt (Savin Rock), defunct, in West Haven, Connecticut
 Thunderbolt (Six Flags New England), in Agawam, Massachusetts

U.S. places
 Thunderbolt, Georgia
 Thunderbolt Peak, California
 Thunderbolt Wreck, a dive site off the coast of Florida
 Thunderbolt Trail, a historic backcountry ski trail in Massachusetts

Sports teams
 Windy City ThunderBolts, a Frontier League baseball team in Crestwood, Illinois
 Silver Spring–Takoma Thunderbolts, a Maryland collegiate summer baseball team
 The Thunderbolts, nickname of the Australia national rugby sevens team second team

Technology
 Thunderbolt (interface), a computer peripheral connector
 Apple Thunderbolt Display, a computer monitor
 HTC ThunderBolt, a cell phone

Transportation
 Thunderbolt (car), British land speed record holder of the 1930s
 Thunderbolt, a GWR 3031 Class locomotive
 Ford Fairlane Thunderbolt, an experimental automobile built in 1964
 BSA Thunderbolt, a British motorcycle manufactured between 1964 and 1972

Other uses
 Thunderbolt (siren), an outdoor emergency warning siren
 Love at first sight, often characterized as a "thunderbolt"
 Thunderbolt, a publication of the U.S. National States' Rights Party
 Lampropeltis getula, a snake species also known as thunderbolt
 The Thunderbolt, a pulp fiction character created by Johnston McCulley (1883-1958)

See also
 Lightning bolt (disambiguation)
 Thunderclap (disambiguation)
 Thunder (disambiguation)
 Thunderbolt and Lightfoot, a 1974 American crime film
 Raiden (disambiguation)